The 2007-08 V-League season was the 4th season of the V-League, the highest professional volleyball league in South Korea. The season started on 1 December 2007 and finished on 17 April 2008. Cheonan Hyundai Capital Skywalkers were the defending champions in the men's league and Cheonan Heungkuk Pink Spiders the defending female champions.

Teams

Men's clubs

Women's clubs

Regular season

League table (Male)

League table (Female)

Play-offs

Bracket (Male)

Bracket (Female)

Top Scorers

Men's

Women's

Player of the Round

Men's

Women's

Final standing

Men's League

Women's League

References

External links
 Official website 

2007 in volleyball
2008 in volleyball
V-League (South Korea)